Danny Joe Brown (August 24, 1951 – March 10, 2005) was the lead singer of the Southern rock group Molly Hatchet after succeeding founder Dave Hlubek in 1976 and co-writer of the band's biggest hits from the late 1970s.

Biography
Brown was born in Jacksonville, Florida, in 1951 and graduated from Terry Parker High School in 1969. Shortly after graduating, he enlisted in the U.S. Coast Guard and was stationed in New York City for two years. Once he left the Coast Guard, Brown's focus turned solely to music and he joined Molly Hatchet in 1974.

He is best known for writing and singing on such songs as "Flirtin' with Disaster" and "Whiskey Man." He was also the vocalist on "Dreams I'll Never See," a faster-tempoed cover of the Allman Brothers song. The band's sound was immediately recognizable by Brown's distinct voice: a deep, raspy, throaty growl.

Brown left Molly Hatchet in 1980 because of chronic diabetes and pancreatic problems, but soon started his own band, The Danny Joe Brown Band, which released a single studio album in 1981. He rejoined Molly Hatchet in 1982 only to leave again in 1995 after suffering a stroke.

Brown moved into his mother's home in Davie, Florida, after becoming ill. He died there on March 10, 2005, at the age of 53. His obituary attributed his death to kidney failure, a complication of the diabetes he had since age 19, along with Hepatitis C.

Brown is buried at Lauderdale Memorial Park in Fort Lauderdale, Florida.

Discography

With Molly Hatchet
 Molly Hatchet (1978)
 Flirtin' with Disaster (1979)
 No Guts...No Glory (1983)
 The Deed Is Done (1984)
 Double Trouble Live (1985)
 Lightning Strikes Twice (1989)

With The Danny Joe Brown Band
 Danny Joe Brown and the Danny Joe Brown Band (1981)

References

External links

1951 births
2005 deaths
American rock singers
American Southern Rock musicians
Burials in Florida
Deaths from kidney failure
Molly Hatchet members
Musicians from Jacksonville, Florida
Songwriters from Florida
People from Davie, Florida
United States Coast Guard enlisted
20th-century American singers
20th-century American male singers
American male songwriters